Soapy Sam may refer to 

 Samuel Wilberforce, Bishop of Winchester
 Samuel Hoare, 1st Viscount Templewood, Conservative politician